St Chad's Catholic and Church of England Academy is a coeducational secondary school located in Runcorn, Cheshire, England.

Previously St Chad's was a Roman Catholic voluntary aided school, but after Phase II of a new building programme costing £7.4 million began in the summer of 2008, the school reopened in 2009 as a joint-faith Roman Catholic and Church of England voluntary aided school administered by the Roman Catholic Diocese of Shrewsbury and the Church of England Diocese of Chester. An extension to the schools science block was constructed in 2013. Some areas of the school are available to hire for community sports facilities.

In March 2022 St Chad's Catholic and Church of England High School converted to academy status and was renamed St Chad's Catholic and Church of England Academy. The school is now sponsored by the St Joseph Catholic Multi Academy Trust, but continues to be under the jurisdiction of the Roman Catholic Diocese of Shrewsbury and the Church of England Diocese of Chester.

St Chad's has links with its partner school in Tongling in Anhui Province, China with trips with staff and students being made regularly between the two schools. St Chad's also has links with St Mary's Boys Secondary School in Nyeri, Kenya, with regular trips being made between the two schools. St Chad's has hosted fundraising events to help support the Kenyan school, which gives young people who live in poverty a chance to get a better education.

Notable  pupils
Nicola Roberts, member of Girls Aloud

References

Secondary schools in the Borough of Halton
Runcorn
Catholic secondary schools in the Diocese of Shrewsbury
Church of England secondary schools in the Diocese of Chester
Academies in the Borough of Halton